Fred may refer to:

People 
 Fred (name), including a list of people and characters with the name

Mononym

 Fred (cartoonist) (1931–2013), pen name of Fred Othon Aristidès, French
 Fred (footballer, born 1949) (1949–2022), Frederico Rodrigues de Oliveira, Brazilian
 Fred (footballer, born 1979), Helbert Frederico Carreiro da Silva, Brazilian
 Fred (footballer, born 1983), Frederico Chaves Guedes, Brazilian
 Fred (footballer, born 1986), Frederico Burgel Xavier, Brazilian
 Fred (footballer, born 1993), Frederico Rodrigues de Paula Santos, Brazilian
 Fred Again (born 1993), British songwriter known as FRED

Television and movies 
 Fred Claus, a 2007 Christmas film
 Fred (2014 film), a 2014 documentary film
 Fred Figglehorn, a YouTube character created by Lucas Cruikshank
 Fred (franchise), a Nickelodeon media franchise
 Fred: The Movie, a 2010 independent comedy film
 Fred the Caveman, French Teletoon production from 2002
 Fred Flintstone, of the 1966 TV cartoon The Flintstones

Animals 
 Fred (baboon), a notorious car raider from Cape Town, South Africa
 Fred the Undercover Kitty, an undercover cat working for the New York Police Department
 Fred la marmotte, official groundhog of Quebec, Canada
 Fred, also known as Monster Pig, a giant pig that was shot in 2007 by an 11-year-old boy

Music 
 Fred (band), an Irish alternative band
 Fred Records, a record label

Songs 
 "Fred", by James Gang from Yer' Album
 "Fred", by Zager & Evans from 2525 (Exordium & Terminus)

Companies 
 Fred (restaurant), Rotterdam, Netherlands
 Fred's, a chain of American retail stores
 Fred's Frozen Foods, US
 Fred Joaillier, French-based jewelry and watch company
 Fred. Olsen & Co., a Norwegian shipping company

Places 
 Fred, Louisiana, US
 Fred, Texas, US

Other uses 
 Fred (XM), channel 44 on XM Satellite Radio prior to 2008
 Fred (chatterbot), an acronym for Functional Response Emulation Device
 Fred Defence, a chess gambit
 Fred the Computer, at the Middlesex News, a U.S. newspaper on the Internet
 Fred the Red, the Manchester United F.C. mascot since 1994
 Tropical Storm Fred (disambiguation)
 FRED (programming language), a built-in computer language integrated in the Framework office suite

See also 
 
 FRED (disambiguation)
 Freddy (disambiguation)